The Second cabinet of Davíð Oddsson in Iceland was formed 23 April 1995.

Cabinets

Inaugural cabinet: 23 April 1995 – 16 April 1998

First reshuffle: 16 April 1998 – 11 May 1999
Geir Haarde replaced Friðrik Klemenz Sophusson as Minister of Finance.

Second reshuffle: 11 May 1999 – 28 May 1999
Davíð Oddsson replaced Þorsteinn Pálsson as Minister of Fisheries and Minister of Justice and Ecclesiastical Affairs. Halldór Ásgrímsson replaced Guðmundur Kristján Bjarnason as Minister for the Environment and Minister of Agriculture.

See also
Government of Iceland
Cabinet of Iceland

References

David Oddsson, Second cabinet of
David Oddsson, Second cabinet of
David Oddsson, Second cabinet of
Cabinets established in 1995
Cabinets disestablished in 1999
Independence Party (Iceland)
Progressive Party (Iceland)